Wheal Trewavas was a copper mine in Cornwall, England, about  west of Porthleven. The ruined engine houses remain, on sea cliffs overlooking Mount's Bay, just east of Trewavas Head. The site is a Scheduled Monument.

History
The mine was in operation from about 1834 to 1846. It exploited four copper lodes, which ran south-east along the coastline.

There are two engine houses. The building to the west served the first shaft, Old Engine Shaft, which was in operation by 1834. It housed an engine of cylinder diameter 18 inches, to pump water from the mine. To the east, New Engine Shaft began operation in 1836; it had a 45-inch engine.

The mine employed about 160 men, and the workings extended under the sea.

Closure of the mine
The mine eventually closed because of flooding. There is a story that the annual dinner of the "tributers" was to take place in a tunnel under the sea; two men making final preparations to the tables noticed water leaking from the tunnel roof, and quickly left. The sea soon broke in, before the time planned for the dinner.

Description
Adjoining the building is a capstan platform; during the operation of the mine, a manually operated capstan lowered equipment down the shaft. The chimney is separate from the engine house, and was built about 1840, replacing an earlier chimney. The engine house and chimney are both Grade II listed buildings.

The engine house and separate chimney of New Engine Shaft are a short distance further east along the coast, near the top of the cliff. They are both Grade II listed buildings.

See also

 Wheal Prosper, Rinsey
 Mining in Cornwall and Devon
 Cornwall and West Devon Mining Landscape

References

Copper mines in Cornwall
Scheduled monuments in Cornwall
Grade II listed buildings in Cornwall